Connor Drought (born June 14, 2001) is an American soccer player who plays as a left back for Cornell Big Red.

Honors 
 Ivy League Men's Soccer All-Second Team: 2019

References

External links
 

Association football defenders
American soccer players
Tacoma Defiance players
Cornell Big Red men's soccer players
USL Championship players
Soccer players from Washington (state)
2001 births
Living people